This is a list of monarchs, royalties, and dynasties following Jainism.

Dynasties

 Ikshvaku dynasty:Thritkaras as twenty-two of twenty-four Tirthankaras were born in this dynasty.
 Harivamsa
 Vajjika League (c. 6th century BCE - c. 468 BCE)
 Pandya dynasty (6th century BCE - 1345 CE) Some rulers were Jains though not all.
 Maurya dynasty (322-184 BCE)
 Mahameghavahana dynasty (250s BCE – 5th century CE)
 Kadamba Dynasty (345–525 CE)
 Western Ganga Dynasty (350 CE – 1000)
 Santara dynasty (7th century CE - 18th century CE)
 Rastrakuta dynasty (735CE-982 CE)
 Shilahara Dynasty (8th century CE–13th century CE)
 Kakatiya dynasty (800CE-1323CE)
 Seuna (Yadava) dynasty (860CE-1317CE)
 Chowta dynasty (12th century CE-18th century CE)

Kings

Raja Siddhartha
Bharata Chakravarti
Bahubali
Chandragupta Maurya (4th century BCE)
Kharavela (2nd century BCE)
Samprati (3rd century BCE)
Ajatashatru (5th century BCE)
Kumarapala (r. 1143-1172)
Āma (8, 9th centuries)
Bimbisara (c. 558 - c. 491 BC)
Sanat Kumara Chakravarti
Samudravijaya
Amoghavarsha (9th century)
Mularaja II (12th century)
Ereyanga (12th century)
Veera Ballala I (12th century)
Shalishuka (r. c. 215 - c. 202 BC)
Shatadhanvan (r. c. 195 - c. 187 BC)
Brihadratha Maurya (187-180 BCE)
Avakinnayo Karakandu
Ilango Adigal

udayin(460-444 BC)

Queens

Attimabbe
Abbakka Chowta (r. 1525-1570s)
Rani Chennabhairadevi

Kings in Jain texts

This list contains rulers that are mentioned in Jain texts. They are listed as follows:

 Bharata chakravartin
 King Sagara
 Sanat Kumara Chakravarti

See also
 Jainism
 History of India
 List of Hindu empires and dynasties

References

Sources

Jain